Torger Tokle (March 7, 1919 – March 3, 1945) was a Norwegian-born American ski jumper and military officer. During his six-year jumping career he won 42 of 48 tournaments and set 24 hill records. He died in action during the battle of Riva Ridge in Italy in 1945. In 1959 he was induced into the  U.S. Ski and Snowboard Hall of Fame.

Biography
Tokle was born in Løkken Verk, a village in Meldal, Sør-Trøndelag county, Norway. His father was a Norwegian mining official, who raised his 20 children in the sport, and skied himself until he was well past 70. Torger started skiing aged three, and at six was already competitively jumped from forty-meter hills. On January 29, 1939 he moved to the United States and settled in Brooklyn, New York. In 1940, he won every tournament he entered, except for the national title, which was taken by Alf Engen. Tokle never lost to Engen after that, and won the national title next year. In October 1942 he enlisted in the US army, serving first in the infantry and then in the 10th Mountain Division. He died in the Battle of Riva Ridge in Italy.

After his death, Torger's brothers Kyrre and Arthur E. Tokle moved to the U.S., becoming established ski jumpers and coaches.

References

1919 births
1945 deaths
American male ski jumpers
Norwegian emigrants to the United States
United States Army personnel killed in World War II
United States Army officers